Ashley Caroline Steel (born 1959) was the vice-chair and global head of transport for KPMG (retired in the summer 2014). Currently she holds non-executive roles on the boards of National Express, GoCo and the BBC. She has been named "one of the UK's most influential gay people".

Steel has a PhD in Management from Henley.

Steel was asked to judge the Independent on Sunday's Pink List in 2010, but declined to do so.

Recognition

 The Independent on Sunday Pink List 2013 (75)
 The Guardian World Pride Power List 2013 (78)
 The Independent on Sunday Pink List 2012 (44)
 The Guardian World Pride Power List 2012 (74)	
 Pride London Power List 2011 (81)
 The Independent on Sunday Pink List 2008 (66)
 The Independent on Sunday Pink List 2007 (50)
 The Independent on Sunday Pink List 2006 (31)

References

1959 births
Living people
British women business executives
BBC Board members
KPMG people
Alumni of Henley Management College
British LGBT businesspeople
British lesbians
Lesbian businesswomen
20th-century British businesswomen
21st-century British businesswomen
21st-century British LGBT people